The  was established during the development of representative government in Meiji period Japan to further strengthen the authority of the state. Its first leader was Yamagata Aritomo (1838–1922), a Chōshū native who has been credited with the founding of the modern Imperial Japanese Army and was the first constitutional Prime Minister of Japan. The Supreme War Council developed a German-style general staff system with a chief of staff who had direct access to the Emperor and who could operate independently of the army minister and civilian officials. The Supreme War Council was the de facto inner cabinet of Japan prior to the Second Sino-Japanese War.

Liaison Conference

From November 1937 and following Emperor Shōwa's order, the Gunji sangikan kaigi was in effect replaced by the Imperial General Headquarters-Government Liaison Conference (大本営政府連絡会議 Daihon'ei seifu renraku kaigi). The Liaison Conferences were intended by the Emperor to bring the chiefs of the Army and Navy General Staff into closer consultation with his government, and to assist in integrating the decisions and needs of the two military sections of Imperial General Headquarters with the resources and policies of the rest of the government. The final decisions of Liaison Conferences were formally disclosed and approved at Imperial Conferences over which the Emperor presided in person at the Kyūden of the Tokyo Imperial Palace.

Its members were the following officials:

 the Prime Minister: Fumimaro Konoe, Hiranuma Kiichirō, Nobuyuki Abe, Mitsumasa Yonai
 the Minister of Foreign Affairs
 the Minister of War
 the Minister of the Navy
 the Chief of the Army General Staff
 the Chief of the Navy General Staff

Supreme Council for the Direction of the War 

In 1944, Prime Minister Kuniaki Koiso established the Supreme Council for the Direction of the War (最高戦争指導会議 Saikō sensō shidō kaigi), which replaced the Imperial General Headquarters-Government Liaison Conference. At the end of the war on August 14, 1945, it consisted of:

Prime Minister: Admiral Kantarō Suzuki
Minister of Foreign Affairs: Shigenori Tōgō
Minister of War: General Korechika Anami
Minister of the Navy: Admiral Mitsumasa Yonai
Chief of the Army General Staff: General Yoshijirō Umezu
Chief of the Navy General Staff: Admiral Soemu Toyoda

See also
 Gozen Kaigi

Military history of Japan
Government of Japan
Military of the Empire of Japan